Enrique Melo (born 23 April 1953) is a Spanish former freestyle swimmer. He competed in two events at the 1972 Summer Olympics.

References

External links
 

1953 births
Living people
Spanish male freestyle swimmers
Olympic swimmers of Spain
Swimmers at the 1972 Summer Olympics
Place of birth missing (living people)